Sultandağı railway station is a railway station near Çobanlar, Turkey. TCDD Taşımacılık operates a daily inter-city train from İzmir to Konya which stops at the station at night. Sultandağı station was opened in 1896 by the Anatolian Railway.

References

External links
TCDD Taşımacılık
Turkish State Railways
Turkish train timetables

Railway stations in Afyonkarahisar Province
Transport in Afyonkarahisar Province
Buildings and structures in Afyonkarahisar Province
Railway stations opened in 1896